Škoda 33Tr SOR is a low-floor articulated trolleybus produced in cooperation of Škoda Transportation (electrical equipment and assembly) and SOR, which supplies the body based on the bus SOR NS 18.

Construction features 
33Tr is derived from SOR NS 18 city bus. It is made of two rigid sections linked by a pivoting joint. Electric motor is located in the rear of the bus. Inside are used plastic Ster seats. Rear axle is VOITH brand, as well as medium axle, the front axle is own production with independent wheel suspension. Only rear C axle is propulsed. Body of the vehicle is welded from steel-voltage profiles, flashings from the outside and interior are lined with plastic sheeting. On the right side of the bus are four doors.

Production and operation 
Production started in 2019. In Czech and Slovak cities they replaced old high-floor trolleybuses Škoda 15Tr. Teplice became the first to operate these trolleybuses.

References

External links

Trolleybus 33 Tr, skoda.cz

Articulated buses
Buses of the Czech Republic
Buses manufactured by SOR
Trolleybuses
Škoda vehicles